Mabel Margaret DeWare ( Keiver; 9 August 1926 – 17 August 2022) was a Canadian politician, senator, and curler.

DeWare was born in Moncton, New Brunswick, to parents Mary and Hugh Keiver. 

In 1978, she was elected to the Legislative Assembly of New Brunswick as a member of the Progressive Conservative Party of New Brunswick. She was re-elected in 1982 and was defeated in 1987. She held three cabinet positions: Minister of Labour and Manpower (1978–1982), Minister of Community Colleges (1983–1985), and Minister of Advanced Education (1985–1987).

In 1990, she was appointed to the Senate of Canada representing the senatorial division of Moncton, New Brunswick. A Progressive Conservative, she was the Opposition Whip in the Senate from 1999 to 2001. She retired on her 75th birthday.

She was inducted in the New Brunswick Sports Hall of Fame in 1976 and the Canadian Curling Hall of Fame as curler/builder in 1987.

DeWare died in Moncton on 17 August 2022, eight days after turning 96.

Electoral results

1987 election 

|Jim Lockyer||align=right|4853||align=right|64.24||align=right|+26.85||align=right|$14,787
|-

|Mabel DeWare||align=right|1916||align=right|25.36||align=right|-29.48||align=right|$13,295
|-

|David Lang||align=right|786||align=right|10.40||align=right|+2.63||align=right|$1,808
|-
| colspan="3" style="text-align:right;"|Total valid votes/expense limit||align=right|7555||align=right|100.00|| style="text-align:right;" colspan="2"|$16,476
|-
| colspan="3" style="text-align:right;"|Total rejected ballots||align=right|47||align=right|0.47||colspan=2|
|-
| colspan="3" style="text-align:right;"|Turnout||align=right|7602||align=right|76.76||align=right|-2.13|||
|-
| colspan="3" style="text-align:right;"|Electors on list||align=right|9904||colspan=3|
|-
| style="background:lightcoral;"|   
|style="width: 180px" colspan=2|Liberal gain from Progressive Conservative
|align=right|Swing||align=right|+28.17||colspan=2|
|}

1982 election 

|Mabel DeWare||align=right|4242||align=right|54.84||align=right|-3.07||align=right|$12,653
|-

|Wayne Patterson||align=right|2892||align=right|37.39||align=right|-1.54||align=right|$10,199
|-

|Brian Harvey||align=right|601||align=right|7.77||align=right|*||align=right|$1,096
|-
| colspan="3" style="text-align:right;"|Total valid votes/expense limit||align=right|7735||align=right|100.00|| style="text-align:right;" colspan="2"|$14,513
|-
| colspan="3" style="text-align:right;"|Total rejected ballots||align=right|60||align=right|0.61||colspan=2|
|-
| colspan="3" style="text-align:right;"|Turnout||align=right|7795||align=right|78.89||align=right|+5.45|||
|-
| colspan="3" style="text-align:right;"|Electors on list||align=right|9881||colspan=3|
|-
| style="background:#99f;"|   
|style="width: 180px" colspan=2|Progressive Conservative hold
|align=right|Swing||align=right|-0.77||colspan=2|
|}

1978 election 

|Mabel DeWare||align=right|4211||align=right|57.91||align=right|+5.52||align=right|$7,358
|-

|Donald A. Canning||align=right|2831||align=right|38.93||align=right|-8.68||align=right|$8,481
|-

|Paul Hebert||align=right|230||align=right|3.16||align=right|*||align=right|$0
|-
| colspan="3" style="text-align:right;"|Total valid votes/expense limit||align=right|7272||align=right|100.00|| style="text-align:right;" colspan="2"|$14,856
|-
| colspan="3" style="text-align:right;"|Total rejected ballots||align=right|84||align=right|0.84||colspan=2|
|-
| colspan="3" style="text-align:right;"|Turnout||align=right|7356||align=right|73.44||align=right|+0.95|||
|-
| colspan="3" style="text-align:right;"|Electors on list||align=right|10,017||colspan=3|
|-
| style="background:#99f;"|   
|style="width: 180px" colspan=2|Progressive Conservative hold
|align=right|Swing||align=right|+7.10||colspan=2|
|}

References

General references

External links 
 

1926 births
2022 deaths
Canadian Baptists
Curlers from New Brunswick
Canadian senators from New Brunswick
New Brunswick Sports Hall of Fame inductees
Canadian women's curling champions
Progressive Conservative Party of New Brunswick MLAs
Members of the Executive Council of New Brunswick
Progressive Conservative Party of Canada senators
Sportspeople from Moncton
Women MLAs in New Brunswick
Women members of the Senate of Canada
Canadian women curlers
Canadian sportsperson-politicians
21st-century Canadian politicians
21st-century Canadian women politicians
Women government ministers of Canada